Constantin Dinulescu (19 April 1931 – 1 February 2017) was a Romanian football forward who played for Romania in the 1960 European Nations' Cup. After he ended his playing career he became a referee who arbitrated 113 Divizia A matches during the course of 12 seasons. He also arbitrated at international and European club level.

Honours
Progresul București
Romanian Cup: 1959–60

Notes

References

External links

1931 births
2017 deaths
Romanian footballers
Romania international footballers
Olympic footballers of Romania
Association football forwards
Liga I players
Liga II players
Unirea Tricolor București players
FC Politehnica Iași (1945) players
FC Politehnica Timișoara players
FC Progresul București players
FCV Farul Constanța players
Romanian football referees
UEFA Champions League referees